The 2012–13 Hellenic Football League season was the 60th in the history of the Hellenic Football League, a football competition in England.

Premier Division

Premier Division featured 17 clubs which competed in the division last season, along with three new clubs:
Highmoor Ibis, promoted from Division One East
Newbury, promoted from Division One East
Marlow, relegated from the Southern Football League

From this league, only Binfield, Cheltenham Saracens, Marlow, Slimbridge, Thame United and Wantage Town have applied for promotion.

League table

Results

Locations

Division One East

Division One East featured ten clubs which competed in the division last season, along with five new clubs:
AFC Hinksey, promoted from the Oxfordshire Senior Football League
Bracknell Town, relegated from the Premier Division
Easington Sports, transferred from Division One West
Headington Amateurs, transferred from Division One West
Henley Town, demoted from the Premier Division

League table

Results

Locations

Division One West

Division One West featured 12 clubs which competed in the division last season, along with four new clubs:
Lambourn Sports, transferred from Division One East
Letcombe, transferred from Division One East
North Leigh reserves
Fairford Town, relegated from the Premier Division

League table

Results

Locations

Division Two East

Division Two East featured seven clubs which competed in the division last season, along with six new clubs:
Bracknell Town reserves
Burnham reserves
Easington Sports reserves, transferred from Division Two West
Holyport reserves
Kidlington reserves, transferred from Division Two West
Slough Town reserves

League table

Results

Division Two West

Division Two West featured eleven clubs which competed in the division last season, along with three new clubs:
Cirencester Town development, demoted from Division One West
Letcombe reserves, transferred from Division Two East
Shortwood United reserves

League table

Results

References

External links
 Hellenic Football League

2012-13
9